Coast buckwheat may refer to different species in the family Polygonaceae:

 Eriogonum latifolium
 Eriogonum parvifolium